Sir Clifden Henry Andrews Eager  (14 June 1882 – 11 August 1969) was an Australian politician.

He was born in Sorrento to Irish-born Anglican reader Clifden Henry Eager and Kate Amelia Andrews. He attended state schools and then the University of Melbourne, where he received a Bachelor of Law in 1909 and a Master of Law in 1910. Around 1909 he married Ernestine Isabella May Campton, with whom he had five children. He was a barrister from 1911. In 1930 he was elected to the Victorian Legislative Council as a Nationalist member for East Yarra Province. He took silk in 1935, and during that year was briefly a minister without portfolio. From 1937 to 1943 he was the unofficial leader of the United Australia Party in the Legislative Council. He was elected to the presidency of the Legislative Council in 1943, and was knighted in 1952. He was disendorsed by the Liberal Party in 1952 after refusing to vote against the Greater Melbourne Council Bill, but he retained both his seat and the presidency as an independent. Eager was defeated in 1958 and retired from politics. He died at Corowa in 1969.

References

1882 births
1969 deaths
Nationalist Party of Australia members of the Parliament of Victoria
United Australia Party members of the Parliament of Victoria
Liberal Party of Australia members of the Parliament of Victoria
Independent members of the Parliament of Victoria
Members of the Victorian Legislative Council
Presidents of the Victorian Legislative Council
Australian Knights Commander of the Order of the British Empire
Australian politicians awarded knighthoods
Australian King's Counsel
Melbourne Law School alumni
20th-century Australian politicians
People from Sorrento